Onuora is a Nigerian surname which may refer to the following people:

People
Anyika Onuora (born 1984), British sprint athlete
Iffy Onuora (born 1967), Scottish football player and coach
Oku Onuora, Jamaican dub poet

See also
Onuora Nzekwu (born 1928), Nigerian professor and writer on Igbo culture